Modulus turbinoides is a species of sea snail, a marine gastropod mollusk in the family Modulidae.

Description
The length of the shell attains 12 mm.

Distribution
This marine species occurs off the Cape Verdes.

References

 Rolán E., 2005. Malacological Fauna From The Cape Verde Archipelago. Part 1, Polyplacophora and Gastropoda.

External links
 Locard, A. (1897-1898). Expéditions scientifiques du Travailleur et du Talisman pendant les années 1880, 1881, 1882 et 1883. Mollusques testacés. Paris, Masson.

Modulidae
Gastropods described in 1897